Danny Longman (born 11 January 1987) is an English ultra-endurance athlete.

2017 Polar Row 
The 6-man team rowed from Longyearbyen, Svalbard to the Arctic ice pack (79'55'500 N) and then onto Jan Mayen. The Polar Row became the most record-breaking ocean row in history as well as the most record-breaking man-powered expedition. The wider expedition claimed over a dozen world records in total, with Longman being awarded 7 world records including being the first to row across the Greenland Sea"  and reaching the northernmost latitude in a rowing vessel

2019 Lake District Swim Challenge 
In August 2019, Longman set a new record for swimming the length of each of the 13 publicly-accessible lakes in the English Lake District (totalling ), while cycling between the lakes. Longman began the human-powered journey at the Southern end of Ullswater with Tom Elliott. Three and a half days later, Longman completed Lake Windermere, England's longest lake, completing the challenge in 78 hours. Unfortunately, Elliott failed to complete the challenge.

2021 Lake District Swim Challenge 
Following George Taplin's new record time of 59 hours, set in 2020 (driving rather than cycling between the lakes), Longman attempted the challenge again in August 2021. Longman set a new record for the  route, with a time of 41 hours and 7 minutes.

References 

1987 births
Living people